Cherrier is the French surname of the following persons:

 Beatrice Cherrier, French historian of economics
Côme-Séraphin Cherrier (Lower Canada politician) (1798–1885), a member of the Legislative Assembly of Lower Canada
 Côme-Séraphin Cherrier (Quebec politician) (1848–1912), a member of the Legislative Assembly of Quebec
 François-Pierre Cherrier (1717–1793), a French-born merchant and notary in Lower Canada.
 Lionel Cherrier (born 1929), a New Caledonian politician.
 Séraphin Cherrier (1762–1843), a merchant and political figure in Lower Canada

See also
Cherrier Lake, Quebec, Canada